Denton Homestead is a historic home located at East Rockaway in Nassau County, New York. It was built as a tavern about 1795, and is a -story, five bay, center hall plan, vernacular Colonial style frame dwelling. The Denton family bought it in 1808 and converted to a residential farmhouse. It has a side gable roof and a hipped roof addition added after the house was moved to its present location in 1924. The front facade features a full width, shed roofed front porch.  The interior features some Colonial Revival style design elements. Also on the property is a contributing carriage house (c. 1900).  The house is a rare surviving former tavern and farmhouse from the village's early period.

It was listed on the National Register of Historic Places in 2014.

References

Houses on the National Register of Historic Places in New York (state)
Colonial Revival architecture in New York (state)
Houses completed in 1795
Houses in Nassau County, New York
National Register of Historic Places in Nassau County, New York